David McNiven may refer to:
David McNiven (footballer, born 1955), Scottish footballer
David McNiven (footballer, born 1978), English footballer

See also
David Niven (1910–1983), actor and novelist